Lawrence McCutcheon (born June 2, 1950) is an American former professional football player who was a running back in the National Football League (NFL) for the Los Angeles Rams from 1972 to 1980, the Denver Broncos and Seattle Seahawks in 1980, and 1981 with the Buffalo Bills, reuniting with former Rams head coach Chuck Knox. He played college football for Colorado State.

Early years
Born and raised in Plainview, Texas, McCutcheon graduated from Plainview High School in 1968 and played college football at Colorado State University in Fort Collins, then a member of the Western Athletic Conference (WAC).

Professional career
McCutcheon was selected in the third round of the 1972 NFL Draft by the Rams, the 70th overall pick. He appeared in 89 games for the Rams, appearing in seven playoff games including Super Bowl XIV. In the 1975 playoffs, McCutcheon established a postseason record by rushing for 202 yards on 37 carries in a win over the St. Louis Cardinals.

Under head coach Knox, McCutcheon led the Rams in rushing for five consecutive seasons, from 1973 through 1977, and was named to the Pro Bowl each year. During his tenure with the Rams, McCutcheon gained a total of 6,186 yards on 1,425 carries. In addition to his five consecutive Pro Bowl appearances, McCutcheon was named Second-team All-Pro in 1974, All-NFC in 1977 and Second-team All-NFC in 1973, 1975 and 1976.

In Super Bowl XIV, McCutcheon threw a 24-yard touchdown pass to Ron Smith, giving the Rams a 19–17 lead over the Pittsburgh Steelers. However, the Rams lost the game, 31–19.

Personal life
McCutcheon was promoted to director of player personnel of the Rams in May 2003, a role he held until 2016. His son Daylon McCutcheon played cornerback for the Cleveland Browns.

References

External links

1950 births
Living people
American football running backs
Buffalo Bills players
Colorado State Rams football players
Denver Broncos players
Los Angeles Rams players
St. Louis Rams executives
National Conference Pro Bowl players
People from Plainview, Texas
Plainview High School (Texas) alumni